San Francisco Lempa is a municipality in the Chalatenango department of El Salvador. 

Municipalities of the Chalatenango Department